Ibrahima Sory Souaré (born 14 July 1982 in Conakry) is a Guinean football midfielder who, as of 2009 is playing for Greece side Kerkyra F.C.

He was a member of the Guinea squad for the 2006 African Nations Cup where the team were eliminated in the quarter-finals.

External links

Profile at RFI 
Profile at Francefootball 

1982 births
Living people
Guinean footballers
Guinea international footballers
Expatriate footballers in Greece
ASOA Valence players
Stade Rennais F.C. players
Jura Sud Foot players
FC Martigues players
Apollon Pontou FC players
A.O. Kerkyra players
Stade Beaucairois players
Association football midfielders